Myriv was an ancient (Iron Age) Scythian settlement in Ukraine. It was one of the largest Scythian cities in Ukraine between the rivers of Dniester and Dnieper. It was founded 800-750 BC. In 900-1250 AD it was a Ruthenian settlement of Kyivan Rus. The city was destroyed during the Mongol invasion of Rus. After the Mongols left Kyivan Rus (Ukraine), the city was rebuilt at other place. It was first mentioned under its modern name of Nemyriv in 1506.

Ancient history of Ukraine
Scythians
Iron Age Europe
Iranian archaeological sites
Nemyriv
Archaeological sites in Ukraine